Señor Muerte and Señor Suerte are aliases used by a number of fictional characters appearing in American comic books published by Marvel Comics.

Ramon
 

The first character to use these names was Ramon Garcia, who was born in Hatillo, Puerto Rico. Ramon was the owner of a chain of gambling casinos and a criminal who called himself "Señor Suerte" (which means "Mr. Luck" in English) in his role as head of criminal gambling operations in New York.  He used the name "Señor Muerte" (which means "Mr. Death" in English) when he killed his opponents.

Ramon sent men to kill Frank Jenks and Luke Cage.  Muerte attempted to kill Luke Cage, and murdered a rival casino owner. He battled Cage, but was electrocuted by his own device during the battle and died.

Ramon reappears without explanation years later, being forced to commit crimes by Lady Caterpillar, who had abducted his wife, Rebecca Clyde.

Jaime and Phillip
 

After Ramon's death, his younger brothers Jaime and Phillip took over his operations, and became the co-owners of their brother's gambling casinos. Jaime became "Señor Suerte" and Phillip became "Señor Muerte". Jaime was a professional thief, and Phillip was a professional assassin.

Phillip, as the new Señor Muerte, posed as his deceased brother Ramon. Alongside the Tarantula, he murdered government agent Ken Astor, and attempted to hijack a military convoy, the Madbombs. He battled Captain America. Phillip wore gloves that were able to release spider venom into his victims.

Jaime, as Señor Suerte, attempted a theft of Tutankhamen artifacts from a museum, and battled Cage and Iron Fist. Jamie and Phillip's gambling operations were disrupted by Cage and Iron Fist. The brothers set death-traps for Cage and Iron Fist, but were still defeated by them.

Powers and abilities
The Garcia brothers were all athletic men with no superhuman powers. They were all average hand-to-hand combatants using basic streetfighting techniques, talented gamblers, and highly skilled businessmen. Additionally, Jaime is an expert thief, and Phillip is an expert assassin and highly skilled in the use of knives, firearms, and explosives.

Ramon, as Señor Muerte, wore synthetic stretch fabric containing circuitry enabling him to charge one hand or the other with an electric load of 10,000 volts and to hurl bolts of electricity over short distances. He owned a private casino equipped with booby-trapped devices, including a giant roulette wheel, razor-edged playing cards, poker chips, and giant dice.

Phillip sometimes wore a duplicate of his late brother's costume, with the same properties, although he sometimes wore a blank-featured face-mask which could be reshaped to resemble a death's head. He used an assortment of knives, high-powered handguns, hand grenades, and flame-throwers concealed in the specially designed pockets of the coat and vest he usually wore. He also wore gloves that released spider venom into his victims.

In other media

Television
 Señor Muerte appears in The Avengers: Earth's Mightiest Heroes episode "To Steal an Ant-Man."

References

Marvel Comics supervillains
Puerto Rican superheroes